The  is an electric multiple unit (EMU) train type operated by the private railway operator Iyo Railway (Iyotetsu) in Matsuyama, Ehime, Japan, since 1987.

Design
The trains were converted from former Keio 5000 series EMU cars between 1987 and 1994.

Formations

, the fleet consists of six three-car sets and two two-car sets, formed as follows. All cars have a driving cab at one end.

3-car sets

 "Mc" cars are motored driving cars (with driving cabs).
 "Tc" cars are unpowered trailer cars.
 The "Mc" cars are equipped with one lozenge-type pantograph.

2-car sets

 "Mc" cars are motored driving cars (with driving cabs).
 "Tc" cars are unpowered trailer cars.
 The "Mc" cars are equipped with one lozenge-type pantograph.

History
The trains were purchased from Keio Corporation and introduced between 1987 and 1994.
Three-car set 725 was the first Iyotetsu EMU to be repainted in the new all-over orange Iyotetsu livery, in August 2015.

Resale

In September 2015, two 700 series cars were sold to the Choshi Electric Railway in Chiba Prefecture for 1.3 million yen.

References

Electric multiple units of Japan
Train-related introductions in 1987
600 V DC multiple units
750 V DC multiple units